was a Japanese professional sumo wrestler from Inzai, Chiba Prefecture. He was the sport's 24th yokozuna.

Career

Early life and career
Son to a former professional sumo wrestler, he however had to appeal to his father to become a sumo wrestler. He joined Miyagino stable because the head coach of that time (former ōzeki Hōō) was also from Chiba Prefecture. Takita Akira made his debut in the jonokuchi division in May 1903, with his shikona name spelled . In May 1908, he was given the former ring name of his master, . He quickly gained popularity because of his style and his famed beauty, calling back yokozuna Futabayama.

Makuuchi career
At the time of his makuuchi debut in 1909, he was one of the last rikishi to compete in the Ekō-in temple before the opening of the old Ryōgoku Kokugikan. During his first makuuchi tournament he was surprisingly paired against ōzeki Komagatake but managed to score a surprise victory. Ōtori knew a rapid ascent. He was promoted to san'yaku twice (in 1910 and 1911), but was rebuffed both times. Ōtori won his first tournament championship in his debut tournament at the rank of ōzeki in January 1913. He was undefeated in that tournament, recording seven wins, one draw and one no decision. His second championship in January 1915, which he took with ten straight wins, saw him promoted to yokozuna. His promotion was subject to debate within the Japan Sumo Association as the  refused him the promotion, arguing it was premature and that the promotion should be put on hold for one more tournament, but the Association pushed through, and Ōtori was given a yokozuna license.
Ōkuma Shigenobu presented him a tachi, or long sword, to use during his yokozuna dohyō-iri.However, due to injuries to his legs and diabetes, his record at sumo's highest rank was very patchy and he did not manage to win any further championships. He was the first yokozuna in history to lose all of his matches in a single tournament. His record as yokozuna was 35 wins against 24 defeats, compared with 36 wins and only four defeats at ōzeki. He retired in May 1920, after the death of his patron Yoshimizu Shigemune (president of Meidensha). In makuuchi, Ōtori won 108 bouts and lost 49, recording a winning percentage of 68.8.

Fighting style

Ōtori was known for his speedy and flamboyant modern sumo, frequently using techniques such as kakenage or katasukashi. He became popular for his distinctive style and brilliant moves amid the strict and old-fashioned top rankers of the time. His techniques earned him the nickname of Ōtori no kenken (鳳のケンケン), "hopping Ōtori". His style was however regarded as unacceptable by some, as yokozuna Hitachiyama, sumo's top performer of the time, style was regarded as both traditional and efficient.

Retirement from sumo
He was head coach of Miyagino stable from 1916 until his death in 1956, succeeding in this to the former maegashira . At the time, active wrestlers could both compete and train junior wrestlers under a double licence system. There was also no mandatory retirement age for elder at that time. During his coaching career, he raised maegashira  who later became his son in law. He also served as a director on the Association's board of directors.In 1944, Ōtori fell into alcoholism and moved back in his home prefecture of Chiba, leaving his apprentices to train in Tatsunami stable. After stepping back from his duties as an elder, he insisted that his successor had to be a yokozuna, so the Miyagino stable became inactive for a while, its wrestlers joining yokozuna Yoshibayama dojo.  Eventually Yoshibayama revived the stable and assumed the Miyagino name in 1960.

Death and homage
During the war, he was confined to Chiba-city because of a chronic gout. He died on November 16, 1956.
On November 11, 2006, a monument to Ōtori was established in his home city of Inzai.
On February 16, 2014, a one meter high cenotaph was erected and an official ceremony was held to honor him in his hometown temple of the Chokaru-ji, Inzai. His remains were still in the Takita family vault at the Enju-ji temple in Yanaka, Tokyo.

A number of Japanese public figures can today trace a family link with Ōtori, including Japanese actor , who is his elder brother's grandson, and Japanese baseball player , who is his great-grandson.

Top division record

References

See also

Glossary of sumo terms
List of past sumo wrestlers
List of sumo tournament top division champions
List of yokozuna

1887 births
1956 deaths
People from Inzai
Japanese sumo wrestlers
Sumo people from Chiba Prefecture
Yokozuna
Place of death missing